Berlin Tegel is a railway station in Tegel, a locality of the Reinickendorf borough of Berlin. It is served by the S-Bahn line .

Whilst the U6 is located a couple of streets away, it is not possible to reach Berlin Tegel Airport directly from this station.

Location
The station is located at km 10.9 of the Kremmener Bahn, at ground level and directly south of the Gorkistraße level crossing. It has two exits on both sides of the railway line. The main entrance is on Buddestraße, near the junction with Grußdorffstraße. There is also a bus stop on the station forecourt, which is served by lines 133 and N25 of Berliner Verkehrsbetriebe (BVG).

References

Tegel
Tegel
Tegel
Railway stations in Germany opened in 1893